Vollen is a village and statistical area (grunnkrets) in Nøtterøy municipality, Norway.

The statistical area Vollen, which also can include the peripheral parts of the village as well as the surrounding countryside, has a population of 674.

The village Vollen is located between Hårkollen in the southeast and Borgheim in the northwest. It is considered a part of the urban settlement Tønsberg, which covers the greater Tønsberg city area as well as the northern and eastern part of Nøtterøy. The urban settlement Tønsberg has a population of 45,447, of which 15,818 people live within Nøtterøy.

References

Villages in Vestfold og Telemark
Tønsberg